Conus (Attenuiconus) is a taxon of sea snails, marine gastropod mollusks in the family Conidae. Although formerly described as a distinct subgenus, it is currently considered as an alternative representation of the cone snail genus, Conus.

Species
All the species formerly classified in the subgenus Attenuiconus are now considered as "alternate representations" of species in the genus Conus:
 Conus (Attenuiconus) attenuatus Reeve, 1844 represented as Conus attenuatus Reeve, 1844
 Conus (Attenuiconus) aureonimbosus Petuch, 1987 represented as Conus aureonimbosus Petuch, 1987
 Conus (Attenuiconus) eversoni Petuch, 1987 represented as Conus eversoni Petuch, 1987
 Conus (Attenuiconus) honkeri Petuch, 1988 represented as Conus honkeri Petuch, 1988
 Conus (Attenuiconus) marileeae (Harasewych, 2014) represented as Conus marileeae (Harasewych, 2014)
 Conus (Attenuiconus) poulosi Petuch, 1993, represented as Conus poulosi Petuch, 1993

Species brought into synonymy
 Attenuiconus ignotus (Cargile, 1998): synonym of Conus ignotus Cargile, 1998

References

 Petuch E. (2013) Biogeography and biodiversity of western Atlantic mollusks. CRC Press. 252 pp. page(s): 212
  Puillandre N., Duda T.F., Meyer C., Olivera B.M. & Bouchet P. (2015). One, four or 100 genera? A new classification of the cone snails. Journal of Molluscan Studies. 81: 1-23

Conidae
Gastropod subgenera